Vivekananda Road is a major east–west thoroughfare in the Indian city of Kolkata and connects Maniktala with Jorasanko. West of Maniktala Police Station, Maniktala Main Road becomes Vivekananda Road. It becomes Kali Krishna Tagore Street after crossing Rabindra Sarani (Ganesh Talkies). This road's name is a tribute for Swami Vivekananda's Ancestral House which is some meters away from Bidhan Sarani Crossing.

Vivekananda Road consists of several important places, such as APC Road crossing, Amherst Street crossing, Bidhan Sarani crossing, Chittaranjan Avenue crossing and Rabindra Sarani crossing.

On 31 March 2016, a flyover under construction on Vivekananda Road near Girish Park in Burrabazar collapsed, killing 22 people and trapping hundreds.

Gallery

References

Roads in Kolkata